Karel Aguilar Chacón (born 5 April 1980) is an athlete from Cuba.  He competes in sprint canoeing.

His first major success came in 2003 when he won the Canadian canoe (C-1) 500m gold medal at the Pan American Games in Santo Domingo, Dominican Republic. Two weeks later, at the world championships in Gainesville, USA he reached two finals, finishing fourth in the C-1 500 m and eight in the C-1 1000 m.

Chacon competed at the 2004 Summer Olympics, this time in the C-1 1000 m. He placed third in his initial heat with a time of 3:54.250, qualifying for the semifinals.  There, he placed second, this time at 3:52.260 to qualify for the final.  In the final, Chacon placed eighth with a time of 3:54.957.

After the 2004 Olympics he and Serguey Torres were chosen as Cuba's new C-2 pairing for international competitions. Replacing the former world champions and Olympic medallists Ibrahim Rojas and Ledys Frank Balceiro was no easy task but the Aguilar and Torres enjoyed immediate success at the 2005 World Championships in Zagreb, Croatia. They won medals in all three C-2 races - silver in the 1000 m and bronze in the 200 m and 500 m. The pair also won another silver in the C-2 1000 m event at the 2007 championships and earned their best finish in the same event at the 2008 Summer Olympics.

References

1980 births
Canoeists at the 2004 Summer Olympics
Canoeists at the 2007 Pan American Games
Canoeists at the 2008 Summer Olympics
Canoeists at the 2011 Pan American Games
Cuban male canoeists
Living people
Olympic canoeists of Cuba
ICF Canoe Sprint World Championships medalists in Canadian
Pan American Games gold medalists for Cuba
Pan American Games medalists in canoeing
Central American and Caribbean Games gold medalists for Cuba
Competitors at the 2006 Central American and Caribbean Games
Central American and Caribbean Games medalists in canoeing
Medalists at the 2011 Pan American Games
20th-century Cuban people
21st-century Cuban people